This is a list of national dances. This may be a formal or informal designation. Not all nations officially recognize a national dance or dances.

By country

References

Dance-related lists
Dance